Silvio Bergamini (20 November 1923 – 18 January 1994) was an Italian rower. He competed at the 1952 Summer Olympics in Helsinki with the men's double sculls where they were eliminated in the semi-final repêchage.

References

1923 births
1994 deaths
Italian male rowers
Olympic rowers of Italy
Rowers at the 1952 Summer Olympics
Sportspeople from Monza
European Rowing Championships medalists